Agathyrna is a genus of seed bugs in the tribe Colpurini from Malesia and New Guinea, erected by Carl Stål in 1861.

Species
The Coreoidea Species File lists:
 Agathyrna ceramica Dolling, 1987
 Agathyrna concolor Dolling, 1987
 Agathyrna minor Dolling, 1987
 Agathyrna praecellens Stål, 1861 - type species
 Agathyrna venosa Dolling, 1987

References

External links
 

Coreidae genera